The Hakodate Nisai Stakes (Japanese 函館2歳ステークス) is a Grade 3 horse race for two-year-old Thoroughbreds run in late July over a distance of 1200 metres at Hakodate Racecourse.

The race was first run in 1968 and was promoted to Grade 3 status in 1984.

Winners since 1984  

 The 1994 race was run over 1000 metres on dirt
 The 2009 race was run at Sapporo Racecourse
 The 2017 winner Cassius was exported to Australia and renamed Kemono

See also
 :Horse racing in Japan
 :List of Japanese flat horse races

References

Turf races in Japan